Robert Bray was an Irish politician.

Brasier was educated at Trinity College, Dublin. He was MP for Lanesborough from 1715 until 1727.

References

Alumni of Trinity College Dublin
Members of the Parliament of Ireland (pre-1801) for County Longford constituencies
Irish MPs 1715–1727